Clinton is a subway station on the Chicago Transit Authority's 'L' system, serving the Blue Line and the West Loop neighborhood of the larger Near West Side community area. The Congress Branch of the Blue line opened in June 1958, and connected to the existing Dearborn subway at LaSalle. It is the closest 'L' station to Union Station, which doubles as Chicago's Amtrak station and the downtown terminal for several Metra lines. It is also the closest station to Chicago's Greyhound Bus terminal. Union Station is two blocks north, while Greyhound is one block west.

It is also the deepest station on the CTA system.

Bus connections
CTA 
  7 Harrison (Weekdays only)
  37 Sedgwick (Weekdays only)
  60 Blue Island/26th (Owl Service)
  157 Streeterville/Taylor (Weekdays only)
  192 University of Chicago Hospitals Express (Weekday Rush Hours only)

Greyhound
Two blocks southwest

Notes and references

Notes

References

External links
CTA: Clinton Station
Clinton Station (Congress Line) Page
Clinton Street entrance from Google Maps Street View

CTA Blue Line stations
Railway stations in the United States opened in 1958